Ann Fabian (born 18 August 1949) is an American historian.

Life 

She was born and raised in California.

Career 
Fabian completed her B.A. in Philosophy at the University of California, Santa Cruz. She received her Ph.D. in American Studies at Yale University. She is Distinguished Professor Emeritus of History at Rutgers University.

Distinctions 
Fabian is a member of the Organization of American Historians, former president of the Society for Historians of the Early American Republic and elected to membership in the Society of American Historians and the American Antiquarian Society.  She received a Guggenheim fellowship in 2002.

Bibliography 

Some of Fabian's publications include:

 Race and Retail: Consumption across the Color Line (2015) 
 Katrina's Imprint: Race and Vulnerability in America (2010) 
 The Skull Collectors: Race, Science, and America's Unburied Dead (2010) 
 The Unvarnished Truth: Personal Narratives in Nineteenth-Century America (2002) 
 Card Sharps and Bucket Shops: Gambling in Nineteenth-Century America (1999)

References

External links

 

1949 births
Living people
American women historians
University of California, Santa Cruz alumni
Yale Graduate School of Arts and Sciences alumni
Rutgers University faculty
20th-century American historians
20th-century American women writers
21st-century American historians
21st-century American women writers